Epipsestis niveifasciata is a moth in the family Drepanidae. It is found in Vietnam.

References

Moths described in 2000
Thyatirinae